Para Todos (Spanish for "For Everyone") it is a program of contests and entertainment transmitted by the Azteca 13 channel, from Monday until Friday with a schedule of 12:00 to 15:00.

Presenters 

 Mauricio Barcelata
 Paolo Botti (Luis Armando)
 Mimí (Replaced by Betty Monroe)
 Héctor Soberón (January–September 2009 present) 
 María Elena Saldaña "La Güereja"
 Betty Monroe (September 2009 - January 2010)

Synopsis 

It is a dynamic and agile TV show in which it is possible to enjoy contests of dance, singing, between others, besides spectacles, kitchen, summary of soap operas and much more. With the great charisma of the presenters they will give you an attractive touch in order that the public pass one evening entertained in company of the family.

Every day the program relies on two guests that they are a part of the index of TV Azteca, which there will rest to two families participants of the contests of the program.
  
This program possesses live public who also can take part in different contests.

Family contests

No te manches 

In this contest the participants will must answer a few questions related to numbers, meanwhile a giant globe gets conceited behind them and it will burst making lose to the member of the team that this one sat while is answering their question.

Z-A-Z 

Also called from it A to the Z, in this contest both families are formed in a row opposite to a basket of Basketball whom they must to their throw if they answer a question correctly, the answers of the questions must go in alphabetical order of A to the Z, touching a letter for every member, if they answer correctly and score in the basket every family win points.

Cántala en Fa 

This contest tries to guess every song played by the band of Para todos and to go on to a microphone (that is opposite to the families) to continue singing the song played with the correct letter.

After a series of songs Paolo Botti comes to present his section " Los pilones de Botti " that are challenges put to every guest related in spite of singing.

Azteca Uno original programming
Mexican game shows
Television game shows with incorrect disambiguation